24th New York Film Critics Circle Awards
January 24, 1958 New York, New York, USA 

The Defiant Ones
The 24th New York Film Critics Circle Awards, honored the best filmmaking of 1958.

Winners
Best Film:
The Defiant Ones
Best Actor:
David Niven - Separate Tables
Best Actress:
Susan Hayward - I Want to Live!
Best Director:
Stanley Kramer - The Defiant Ones
Best Screenplay:
Nedrick Young and Harold Jacob Smith - The Defiant Ones
Best Foreign Language Film:
Mon Oncle • France/Italy

References

External links
1958 Awards

1958
New York Film Critics Circle Awards, 1958
New York Film Critics Circle Awards
New York Film Critics Circle Awards
New York Film Critics Circle Awards